is a multi-use stadium in Musashino, Tokyo, Japan. It is currently used mostly for football matches and athletics events. This stadium's capacity is 5,000 people.

Athletics (track and field) venues in Japan
Football venues in Japan
Sports venues in Tokyo
Musashino, Tokyo
Multi-purpose stadiums in Japan
Sports venues completed in 1989
1989 establishments in Japan